The Caturiges (Gaulish: Caturīges, 'kings of combat') were a Gallic tribe dwelling in the upper Durance valley, around present-day towns of Chorges and Embrun, during the Iron Age and the Roman period.

Name 
They are mentioned as Caturiges by Caesar (mid-1st c. BC) and Pliny (1st c. AD), and as Katourgídōn (Κατουργίδων) by Ptolemy (2nd c. AD).

The Gaulish ethnonym Caturīges (sing. Caturix) literally means 'kings of combat'. It stems from the Celtic root catu- ('combat, battle') attached to rīges ('kings').

The city of Chorges, attested in the 4th c. AD as Caturrigas (Cadorgas in 1062, Chaorgias in 1338), is named after the tribe.

Geography

Territory 
The Caturiges dwelled in the upper course of the Durance river. Their territory was located east of the Tricorii, Avantici and Edenates (further west lived the Vocontii), south of the Brigianii and Quariates, west of the Veneni and Soti, and north of the Savincates. They were probably clients to the larger Vocontian people as part of their confederation.

Initially part of the province of Alpes Cottiae after the Roman conquest, the Caturiges were integrated into the province of Alpes Maritimae during the reign of Diocletian (284–305 AD).

Settlements 
Their chief town was known as Eburodunum (modern Embrun), located on a rocky plinth that dominated the Durance river. It was an important station on the route between Gaul the Italian Peninsula. After the western part of the province of Alpes Cottiae was transferred to the Alpes Maritimae under Diocletian (284–305), Eburodunum replaced Cemenelum as the capital of the Alpes Maritimae.

Caturigomagus ('market of the Caturiges'; modern Chorges) was a frontier city located on the route to Italy via the Col de Montgenèvre, in the western part of the Caturigian territory near the border between the Regnum Cottii and the Vocontian confederation. Probably outshined by the neighbouring Eburodunum and Vappincum (Gap), the city declined in the 4th century AD and was not listed as civitates by the Notitia Galliarum ca. 400.

History 
According to Pliny, the Caturiges were originally part of the Insubres. The presence of a Mars Caturix in another town named Eburodunum (Yverdon-les-Bains, Switzerland), as well as other mentions near Barrois, in the Po Valley, and perhaps in Haute-Savoie, may indicate ancient migrations, although their period and direction remain unknown.

In the mid-first century BC, the Caturiges are mentioned by Julius Caesar as a tribe hostile to Rome. In what appears to be a concerted attack, they attempted to prevent his passage through the upper Durance along with the Ceutrones and Graioceli in 58 BC.

They are mentioned by Pliny the Elder as one of the Alpine tribes conquered by Rome in 16–15 BC, and whose name was engraved on the Tropaeum Alpium. They also appear on the Arch of Susa, erected by Cottius in 9–8 BC.

See also
 Ceutrones
 Graioceli
 Vocontii

References

Primary sources

Bibliography 

 

 
Historical Celtic peoples
Gauls
Tribes of pre-Roman Gaul
Ancient peoples
History of Hautes-Alpes